Bryoria pseudofuscescens is a species of lichen of the family Parmeliaceae.

As of July 2021, its conservation status has not been estimated by the IUCN. In Iceland, it is found in only one location in Gálgahraun lava field in Álftanes and is locally classified as a critically endangered species (CR).

References

Lichen species
Lichens described in 1977
pseudofuscescens
Taxa named by Vilmos Kőfaragó-Gyelnik